Dainuvīte is a Latvian feminine given name. The associated name day is December 26.

References 

Latvian feminine given names
Feminine given names